Written in Chalk is an album by Buddy and Julie Miller, released in 2009. It won numerous awards at the 2009 Americana Music Association awards:  Album of the Year and the song "Chalk" won the Song of the Year. Buddy Miller won Artist of the Year and the duo won Duo/Group of the Year.

The album art is a painting by Brian Kershisnik.

Track listing
All songs by Julie Miller unless otherwise noted.
 "Ellis County" – 3:51
 "Gasoline and Matches" (Julie Miller, Buddy Miller) – 3:14
 "Don't Say Goodbye"– 5:10
 "What You Gonna Do Leroy" (Mel Tillis) – 3:45
 "Long Time" – 4:13
 "One Part, Two Part" (Dee Ervin) – 3:43
 "Chalk" – 3:40
 "Everytime We Say Goodbye" – 4:34
 "Hush, Sorrow" – 4:02
 "Memphis Jane" – 6:16
 "June" – 4:15
 "The Selfishness in Man" (Leon Payne) – 4:20

Personnel 
 Julie Miller – vocals, guitar, background vocals
 Buddy Miller – vocals, guitar, background vocals
 Emmylou Harris – vocals
 Patty Griffin – vocals
 Robert Plant – vocals ("What You Gonna Do Leroy")
 Larry Campbell – fiddle, mandolin
 John Deaderick – piano, keyboards
 Chris Donohue – bass
 Stuart Duncan – fiddle
 Dennis Crouch – bass
 Byron House – bass
 Brady Blade, Jr. – drums
 Jay Bellerose – drums
 Byran Owings – drums
 Kami Lyle – trumpet
 Matt Rollings – piano
 Gurf Morlix – lap steel guitar
 Russ Pahl – pedal steel guitar
 Ann McCrary – background vocals
 Regina McCrary – background vocals

Chart positions

References

 

2009 albums
Buddy Miller albums
Julie Miller albums